Leon Srabian Herald (born Leon Der Srabian; 15 May 1896 – 7 September 1976) was an Armenian-American poet who wrote the first English-language by an Armenian author on the subject of the Armenian genocide.

Biography

Background

Herald was born in Put-Aringe, near Erzincan in 1896.  In 1912, he emigrated with his family to America.

He worked briefly in car factories in Detroit. Then, in the early 1920s, he attended the University of Wisconsin at Madison, where he befriended Zona Gale and Marianne Moore, fellow poet and editor of The Dial literary magazine.  He wrote poems and reviews for the Wisconsin State Journal. He became a naturalized U.S. citizen in 1923.

Career
In 1925, Herald published a first book of poems, This Waking Hour.  The Dial serialized his memoirs monthly from December 1926 to June 1927, which describe his home village, education in Cairo, and travel to the States.

Later that year he moved to New York, where he lived almost all his life.

In 1925, he attended the MacDowell Colony in Peterborough, New Hampshire.  In 1928, he attended the Yaddo Colony in Saratoga Springs, New York.

In 1927, he worked in the New York Public Library with Whittaker Chambers.

During the 1920s and 1930s, he published in The Nation, The New Republic, Commonweal, Poetry, and Ararat (Armenian quarterly).

His story "Power of Horizon" appeared in Edward J. O'Brien's collections of Best Short Stories of 1929.  Work also appeared in Armenian-American Poets: A Bilingual Anthology and in William S. Braithwaite's Anthology of Magazine Verse.

In 1935, he helped form the Federal Writers' Project.

At some time, he served as editor of two Armenian-American publications:  Youth (weekly) and Learning'm (journal).

Communism
Herald was "always an advocate of the working class."

In the late 1920s, he joined the John Reed Club. He was a delegate to Club's 1932 national convention (and claimed to have traveled with Whittaker Chambers, which Allen Weinstein claimed was not possible).

He was a member of the CPUSA-led League of American Writers (1935-1943).

In the 1960s, Herald later provided this information to Meyer Zeligs, a psychoanalyst who wrote a pscyho-biography called Friendship and Fratricide about Whittaker Chambers.  Herald told Zeligs that Chambers had tried to sleep with him in 1932, demonstrating homosexuality.  Zeligs claimed he had not hidden his identity – but in fact had written his name as "Leon S. Herald" whereas the poet was well known under his full name in America as "Leon Srabian Herald."

Personal and death
In 1915, Herald lost his family in Armenia during the Armenian genocide.

In 1938, he married Betty Forster.  In 1939 they had a son, John Whittier Herald, known professionally as folk bard John Herald.  In 1942, his wife died of cancer.

In 1946, he had a nervous breakdown.  He suffered thereafter for the rest of his life from insomnia.

He died in 1976.

Works
Herald dedicated his only book of poetry "To Those Disinherited of Life in 1915," making him
"the very first work in English by an Armenian author, encompassing the subject" of the Armenian genocide.

Books:

 This Waking Hour (1915)

Poems, Stories:
 "The Watermelon and the Saint" in The Dial (August 1928)
 "Power of Horizon," short story in The Dial (April 1929), reprinted in The Best Short Stories of 1929 and the Yearbook of the American Short Story, ed. Edward J. O’Brien (New York:  Dodd Mead, 1929)
 "Four Poems" (New York: New American Caravan, 1929), pages 340-342
 "Job" in New Masses'' (1930)

Correspondence:

 Sherwood Anderson
 Horace Gregory
 Granville Hicks
 Sidney Hook

See also
 Armenian genocide
 The Dial
 John Reed Club
 League of American Writers
 Whittaker Chambers

References

External sources
 Herald, Leon Srabian - 1929-1931, Letters

20th-century American poets
American male poets
American writers of Armenian descent
1896 births
1976 deaths
Armenians from the Ottoman Empire
American male short story writers
20th-century American short story writers
20th-century American male writers
MacDowell Colony fellows
People from Erzincan
Emigrants from the Ottoman Empire to the United States
Place of death missing
Federal Writers' Project people